is a Japanese judoka.

He was born in Kamifukuoka, Saitama., and began judo at the age of 8. He entered the Asahi Kasei after graduating from Tsukuba University.

He is good at Seoinage, o soto gari and osaekomi waza. and got gold medal of World Junior Championships held at Nabeul in 2000.

As of 2010, Takamatsu coaches judo at his alma mater, Toin Gakuen, where he previously studied as an undergraduate.

References

External links
 

Japanese male judoka
1982 births
Sportspeople from Saitama Prefecture
Living people
Olympic judoka of Japan
Asian Games medalists in judo
Judoka at the 2006 Asian Games
Judoka at the 2010 Asian Games
Asian Games silver medalists for Japan
Medalists at the 2006 Asian Games
Medalists at the 2010 Asian Games
Universiade medalists in judo
Universiade silver medalists for Japan
Medalists at the 2003 Summer Universiade
20th-century Japanese people
21st-century Japanese people